MS Augustus may refer to two Italian ocean liners that have been named after the Roman emperor Augustus:
 , a combined ocean liner and cruise ship built in 1927 for Navigazione Generale Italiana, later transferred to Italian Line. 
 , a 27,090 GRT, luxury ocean liner built in 1950 for Italian Line. 

Ship names